Golandar (also Romanized as Gulandar; also known as Golandām) is a village in Momenabad Rural District, in the Central District of Sarbisheh County, South Khorasan Province, Iran. At the 2006 census, its population was 124, in 34 families.

References 

Populated places in Sarbisheh County